Pope Francis has created cardinals at eight consistories held at roughly annual intervals beginning in 2014, most recently on 27 August 2022. He has created 121 cardinals from 66 countries, 23 of which had never been represented in the College of Cardinals. 
His appointments include the first Scandinavian since the Reformation, the first from Goa since an episcopal see was established there in 1533, the first from Latin America's indigenous peoples, and the first from India's Dalit class.

Following the 2022 consistory, 83 of the cardinal electors had been appointed by Francis, 38 by Pope Benedict XVI, and 11 by Pope John Paul II. Each of Francis' consistories has increased the number of cardinal electors from less than the set limit of 120 to a number higher than 120, as high as 132 in 2022, though never as high as the record 135 set by Pope John Paul II in 2001 and 2003. Eightieth birthdays will reduce the number of electors to 120 on 30 July 2023, 11 months after the last consistory, although deaths of cardinals could bring that date forward.

Francis has shifted membership in the College of Cardinals away from Europe, making it all but certain that the conclave to choose his successor will be the first where Europeans do not account for a majority of electors. As of the conclusion of the 2022 consistory, of the 83 cardinals appointed by Francis who would be eligible to participate as electors in a papal conclave, only 28 (34%) are European. Some 52% of the electors were Europeans at the 2013 conclave that elected Francis, but only 40% are Europeans as of August 2022.

Cardinal electors
Francis' consistories have all brought the number of cardinal electors above the maximum of 120 introduced by Pope Paul VI, reaching between 121 and 132 electors, and remaining higher than 120 for almost a year following the 2019 consistory. His predecessors exceeded the 120 limit on several occasions: Paul VI himself had increased the number of cardinal electors to 134 in 1969, before he introduced the 120 limit in 1975. Pope John Paul II brought the number as high as 135 in 2001 and 2003, while Pope Benedict XVI's highest was 125 in 2012.

Francis' first four consistories increased the number of electors above 120 modestly for short periods: to 122 in 2014 for less than a month, to 125 in 2015 for two months, to 121 in 2016 for two weeks, and to 121 in 2017 for ten weeks.

In the June 2018 consistory, Francis again increased the number of cardinal electors to 125, and the count only fell to 120 after ten months. 
The October 2019 consistory increased the number of electors to 128. The 80th birthdays of four electors reduced that number to 124 in two weeks, but almost a year passed before the number of cardinal electors fell to 120 on 29 September 2020.
The November 2020 consistory raised the number of electors to 128 again, but their number returned to 120 a little more quickly than after the previous consistory, on 7 November 2021. 
The August 2022 consistory raised the number of cardinal electors to 132, with the 80th birthdays of electors set reduce that figure to 120 in little more than a year, shortened by the death of Richard Baawobr in November 2022 to 11 months.

22 February 2014
On 31 October 2013, Pope Francis announced plans to name new cardinals in a consistory on 22 February 2014. In December 2013, he said that rumors that he might name a woman cardinal were not to be taken seriously. He announced the names of 19 new cardinals on 12 January 2014. Sixteen were under the age of 80, eligible to vote in papal conclaves. Observers attempting to interpret Francis' approach to naming cardinals noted the absence of certain names, including the heads of the dioceses of Venice and Turin and the Vatican Librarian and Archivist. Others noted a preference for clerics with pastoral experience and only a single theologian, Müller. John L. Allen said the choices made the February meeting the "Consistory of the Periphery", noting the "broad global distribution" of the new cardinals. Of the nomination of the archbishop of Perugia rather than those of more prestigious dioceses like Turin and Venice, La Stampa said: "Any career planners in the Church who had the path from the seminary to the cardinalship set out very clearly in their minds will have to think again." 

Pope Francis sent a letter to each cardinal-designate that said:

Those made cardinal at the consistory were:

Pope emeritus Benedict XVI attended the consistory. He doffed his zucchetto when Pope Francis came down the nave of St. Peter's Basilica to greet him, and took a seat in a row with several cardinals using a chair the same as theirs. Loris Francesco Capovilla was granted a dispensation and did not attend the consistory.

Prior to this consistory, there were 106 cardinals under the age of 80 and eligible to participate in the election of a pope, and the addition of 16 new cardinals under age 80 brought the total to 122, although another 10 were due to turn 80 in the remainder of 2014. Because the maximum number of cardinals allowed to participate in a papal conclave is set at 120, the number of cardinals below 80 is usually limited to 120, although that limit has occasionally been exceeded. The appointments brought the total number of cardinals to 218.

14 February 2015
On 11 December 2014, the Vatican announced that new cardinals would be created at a consistory on 14 February 2015. On 4 January 2015, Pope Francis announced the names of 20 cardinals-designate, including 15 who were under the age of 80. Vatican spokesman Rev. Federico Lombardi said the list "confirms that the pope doesn't feel tied to the traditional 'cardinal sees'", like Turin and Venice, "which reflected historic reasons in various countries. Instead we have various nominations of archbishops or bishops of sees in the past that wouldn't have had a cardinal." The selections continued the pattern Pope Francis established the previous year, showing a "preference for diocesan bishops" and for the southern hemisphere. Of those under the age of 80, only one is a member of the Curia (Mamberti); three are bishops rather than archbishops; four are the first cardinals from their countries (Cape Verde, Myanmar, Panama, Tonga) and others from a diocese that has not had one for decades (Agrigento, Italy, not since 1786; Ancona, Italy, not in more than a century; Montevideo, Uruguay, not since 1979; Valladolid, Spain, not since 1919) or never had one (Morelia, Mexico). Nine have been elected by their peers as president of a national or regional episcopal conference. These appointments brought the number of cardinal electors to 125, while two electors would turn 80 in April. The total number of cardinals reached 227 after the consistory.

On 23 January 2015, Pope Francis advised each nominee how to respond to his appointment: "Accept it with humility. Only do so in a way that in these celebrations there does not creep in a spirit of worldliness that intoxicates more than grappa on an empty stomach, disorienting and separating one from the cross of Christ."

The cardinals were invited to a consistory on 12–13 February devoted to presenting a preliminary plan for the reform of the Roman Curia to the entire College of Cardinals. Nineteen of the twenty new cardinals attended along with 148 of the 207 cardinals.

Pope emeritus Benedict XVI again attended the consistory and was greeted by Pope Francis before and after the ceremony. The only new cardinal unable to attend was Archbishop José de Jesús Pimiento Rodríguez, whose health prevented him from traveling to Rome.

19 November 2016 
On 9 October 2016, the Pope announced that he planned to create new cardinals at a consistory on 19 November 2016, including 13 cardinals under the age of 80 and four over the age of 80. His selections continued to demonstrate his preference for the peripheries and places not previously represented in the College of Cardinals. Several are the first named cardinals from their countries. Of those who are under the age of 80, only Farrell is a member of the Roman Curia. In choosing Simoni, Francis named his first cardinal who was not a bishop; Simoni, who was one of the appointments over age 80, received a papal dispensation from the requirement of episcopal consecration. The appointments brought the total number of cardinals to 228 and the number of cardinal electors to 121.

Asked a year later at a meeting with Jesuits in Bangladesh why he named a cardinal from "a nation where there is such a small Christian community" (about 600,000, of which about 400,000 are Catholic), Francis said:

All the new cardinals attended the consistory on 19 November except Lesotho Bishop Khoarai, who was 87 and unable to travel. For the first time since his retirement Pope emeritus Benedict XVI did not attend. The new cardinals were given the rank of cardinal priest except for Zenari, Farrell, and Simoni, who were made cardinal deacons. Cardinal Nzapalainga became the youngest member of the College of Cardinals and the first born after the Second Vatican Council. Following the consistory, Pope Francis and the 16 new cardinals present visited the Pope emeritus as a group at his residence in Mater Ecclesiae Monastery and received his blessing.

28 June 2017
On 21 May 2017, Pope Francis announced a consistory for the elevation of five new cardinals on 28 June. He adhered to his established pattern of appointing cardinals from the peripheries, including the first cardinals from El Salvador, Laos, Mali, and Sweden, the last of those also the first cardinal from Scandinavia. All five are under the age of 80. According to the National Catholic Reporter, Gregorio Rosa Chávez is "believed to be the first auxiliary bishop to have been made a cardinal in at least the modern era." It has also been claimed that Rosa is the first parish pastor to be named cardinal in decades. With these new cardinals, the number of cardinal electors reached 121 and the total number of cardinals amounted to 225.

Following the consistory on 28 June, Pope Francis and the new cardinals visited Pope emeritus Benedict XVI, who did not attend the ceremony.

28 June 2018
On 20 May 2018, Pope Francis announced a consistory for the elevation of fourteen new cardinals on 29 June, which was later changed to 28 June. The list of new cardinals included 11 young enough to participate in a papal election. Those named were an international group, as is typical of Francis, including prelates from Pakistan, Japan, and Madagascar, countries unrepresented in the College since 1994, 2007, and 2010, respectively. He also named two members of the Roman Curia, an official of the papal household, and another of the Diocese of Rome. Ticona Porco, of Quechuan background, became the first Latin American cardinal of indigenous origin. With this consistory Francis again raised the number of cardinal electors to 125. The number of electors declined to 120 on 27 April 2019. The total number of cardinals reached 226 after the consistory.

At the consistory, Sako addressed Francis on behalf of the new cardinals, thanking him for the concern he has shown for the small, persecuted Catholic population of the Middle East. Francis warned the new cardinals against "palace intrigues that take place, even in curial offices". Sako did not receive the same red biretta as the others, but a rounder red "shash" traditionally worn by cardinals of the Chaldean Catholic Church. Francis and the new cardinals visited Pope emeritus Benedict following the consistory.

5 October 2019
On 1 September 2019, Pope Francis announced that he would hold a consistory to create thirteen new cardinals on 5 October, including ten who are young enough to participate in a papal conclave. This brought the number of cardinal electors to 128, eight more than the limit set by Pope Paul VI, but often ignored. The number of cardinal electors returned to 120 on 29 September 2020. The total number of cardinals reached 225 after the consistory. 

The individuals named represent the international character of the Church, including prelates from Guatemala and Indonesia, as well as those with expertise on the care of migrants and relations with Islam; those from Luxembourg and Morocco were the first cardinals from those countries. Three of those named are Curial officials, including the only new cardinal of this consistory not already a bishop, Czerny, who was consecrated a bishop the day before the consistory.

Following the consistory, Pope Francis and the new cardinals visited Pope emeritus Benedict, who spoke to them briefly and gave them his blessing.

28 November 2020
On 25 October 2020, Pope Francis announced he would create thirteen new cardinals, nine of them young enough to be cardinal electors, at a consistory scheduled for 28 November. The list included the first cardinals from Brunei and Rwanda; the first Conventual Franciscan to become a cardinal in almost 160 years (Gambetti); the first African American cardinal (Gregory); the first Archbishop of Capiz to be made a cardinal; and the first Archbishop of Siena to be made a cardinal since 1801. Feroci, a parish priest, was consecrated a bishop on 15 November. Gambetti's service as custos ended on 12 November. Cantalamessa was granted a dispensation from the requirement that he be consecrated a bishop.

Because of COVID-19 pandemic travel restrictions, two of the new cardinals, Jose Advincula and Cornelius Sim, did not journey to Rome and instead viewed the ceremony via a digital link along with other cardinals unable to travel. The other eleven cardinals-designate self-quarantined at the Vatican's Casa Santa Marta in the days preceding the ceremony. A hundred other guests were allowed in the basilica. Everyone but Pope Francis and the servers wore masks. The kiss of peace normally exchanged between the new cardinals and the other cardinals in attendance was omitted, as were the customary receptions following the ceremony. Francis and the eleven new cardinals in attendance visited Pope emeritus Benedict after the ceremony. This consistory brought the number of cardinal electors to 128 and the total number of cardinals to 229. Of the 128 electors, 73 had been appointed by Francis, 39 by Pope Benedict XVI, and 16 by Pope John Paul II. The number of electors fell to 120 on 7 November 2021 when Angelo Scola turned 80.

27 August 2022
On 29 May 2022, Pope Francis announced he would create twenty-one new cardinals, sixteen of them young enough to be cardinal electors, at a consistory scheduled for 27 August. Among the new electors there are three Curial officials, natives of Korea, Spain, and the United Kingdom; only three other Europeans, one of them a missionary in Mongolia; two each from India and Brazil; and others from East Timor, Ghana, Nigeria, Paraguay, Singapore, and the United States. The appointments include the first cardinals from East Timor, Mongolia, Paraguay, and Singapore, the first ordinary of Goa since its erection in the 16th century, the first from India's Dalit caste. and the first from the Amazon region. 
Two are suffragan bishops, Cantoni and McElroy, whose metropolitan archbishops are not cardinals. Of two not yet bishops, Frezza received his episcopal consecration on 23 July and Ghirlanda received a dispensation from the requirement that all cardinals be bishops.

In June, Pope Francis granted the request of one of those he had named, Lucas Van Looy, Bishop emeritus of Ghent, that he not be made a cardinal. Van Looy cited renewed criticism of his handling of charges of sexual abuse by priests when he was Bishop of Ghent.

The consistory coincides with a meeting of the entire College of Cardinals previously scheduled for 29–30 August to consider the new apostolic constitution, Praedicate evangelium, which took effect on 5 June.

On 27 August, Pope Francis created twenty cardinals, fifteen assigned to the rank of cardinal priests and five cardinal deacons. All of them attended the consistory except Baawobr who had traveled to Rome but was taken ill and hospitalized the day before the consistory. Among the cardinals in attendance was Angelo Becciu, invited by Pope Francis to attend this consistory despite having resigned the privileges of a cardinal. After the ceremony, the pope and the nineteen new cardinals in attendance visited Pope Emeritus Benedict XVI at his residence. The nineteen then held the customary receptions, which had been suspended in 2020 because of the COVID-19 pandemic. Three of the new cardinals were the three youngest cardinals: Costa at 55, do Carmo da Silva at 54, and Marengo at 48.

See also

List of current cardinals

Notes

References

 
Lists of 21st-century people
Francis
College of Cardinals
21st-century Catholicism
 
2014 in Vatican City
2015 in Vatican City
2016 in Vatican City
2017 in Vatican City
2018 in Vatican City
2019 in Vatican City
2020 in Vatican City
2022 in Vatican City
Pope Francis